Rafael de Juan (12 August 1924 – November 2004) was a Spanish sports shooter. He competed at the 1952 Summer Olympics and 1960 Summer Olympics.

References

1924 births
2004 deaths
Spanish male sport shooters
Olympic shooters of Spain
Shooters at the 1952 Summer Olympics
Shooters at the 1960 Summer Olympics
Sportspeople from Madrid
20th-century Spanish people